Andrew Lesnie ACS ASC (1 January 1956 – 27 April 2015) was an Australian cinematographer. He was best known as the cinematographer for The Lord of the Rings trilogy (2001–2003) and its prequel The Hobbit trilogy (2012–2014), both directed by New Zealand director Peter Jackson. He received the Academy Award for Best Cinematography for his work on The Lord of the Rings: The Fellowship of the Ring in 2002.

Early life and career
Lesnie was born in Sydney, New South Wales, on 1 January 1956, the son of Shirley (Lithgow) and Allan Lesnie, who worked for the family's company, butcher suppliers Harry Lesnie Pty Ltd.

He was educated at Sydney Grammar School. Andrew was well liked and popular at school. Lesnie finished 6th form and his Higher School Certificate in 1974. He started his career in 1978 as an assistant camera operator on the film Patrick (1978) while he was still in school at Australian Film, Television and Radio School (AFTRS). sd

His first job after graduation in 1979 was as a cameraman on the Logie Award-winning Australian magazine-style afternoon TV show Simon Townsend's Wonder World. Simon Townsend gave Lesnie almost daily opportunities to develop his craft with little restriction over a wide variety of stories and situations, and to experiment with camera and lighting techniques in hundreds of locations and situations. After two years of working on the show, Lesnie moved on to numerous Australian film and television productions, including the mini-series Bodyline.

Later, he worked as a second camera assistant on the film The Killing of Angel Street (1981).

Lesnie would then go on to develop his craft as he photographed films such as Stations (1983), The Delinquents (1989), Temptation of the Monk (1993), and Spider and Rose (1994).

Career
His work began receiving major attention after the release of the anthropomorphic pig story Babe (1995) and its sequel, Babe: Pig in the City. He was director of photography on Peter Jackson's Lord of the Rings trilogy, and received an Oscar for his work on The Lord of the Rings: The Fellowship of the Ring in 2002. Since then, he filmed several other Jackson-directed films, including King Kong and The Lovely Bones, and also filmed The Hobbit films directed by Jackson.

The Lord of the Rings trilogy (2001–03)
Lesnie used motion picture camera company Arri's Arriflex 435, Arriflex 535, and ArriCam Studio 35mm film cameras for the trilogy. He used Carl Zeiss Ultra Prime Lenses and Kodak's 5279 (tungsten-balanced) film stock to photograph the films.

Lesnie planned far ahead into the production with Peter Jackson with previsualisation programs to help establish frame sizes and angles, as well as construction of sets. During filming, Lesnie emphasised earthly colours in the makeup and wardrobe of the cast and extras.

At the acceptance speech for his Oscar win for Fellowship of the Ring, Lesnie dedicated his acceptance to chief lighting technician Brian Bansgrove, who he described as a major contributor to the quality of the film's cinematography.

The Hobbit trilogy (2012–14)

For production, Lesnie used Red Digital Cinema's Epic cameras as well as Carl Zeiss Ultra Prime Lenses to photograph the film. Jackson and Lesnie decided to shoot the film in 3D with as many as 15 stereoscopic camera rigs (2 cameras each) with 3ality. They also decided to shoot the film in an uncommon frame rate of 48 frames per second versus the industry standard of 24 frames per second. This would make Lesnie the first cinematographer to employ such a method that claims to induce more clarity, reduce motion blur, and make 3D easier to watch.

The Water Diviner
Lesnie's final film, The Water Diviner, directed by and starring Russell Crowe, was released in Australia in December 2014 and in America in April 2015, one week before his death.

Personal life

Lesnie lived on Sydney's north coast.  He was a member of both the Australian Cinematographers Society and the American Society of Cinematographers. Lesnie died of a heart attack in his Sydney home on 27 April 2015.

Death

Andrew Lesnie died of fatal heart attack on Monday the 27th of April 2015, after having suffered from a heart condition for half a year.

Filmography

Awards and nominations

References

External links

Andrew Lesnie's profile on the AFTRS website
Russell Crowe remembers late cinematographer Andrew Lesnie

1956 births
2015 deaths
Australian cinematographers
Australian Film Television and Radio School alumni
Best Cinematographer Academy Award winners
Best Cinematography BAFTA Award winners
People educated at Sydney Grammar School
People from Sydney